Cercyon is a genus of water scavenger beetles in the family Hydrophilidae. There are at least 50 described species in Cercyon.

Species
These 50 species belong to the genus Cercyon.

References

Further reading

External links

 

Hydrophilidae